Staraya Veduga is a rural locality (a selo) and the administrative center of Starovedugskoye Rural Settlement, Semiluksky District, Voronezh Oblast, Russia. The population was 1,211 as of 2010. There are 21 streets.

Geography 
Staraya Veduga is located 55 km northwest of Semiluki (the district's administrative centre) by road. Staraya Olshanka is the nearest rural locality.

References 

Rural localities in Semiluksky District